The Joint Unconventional Warfare Task Force Execute Order is a secret U.S. Defense Department Directive, signed Sept. 30, 2009 by General David Petraeus, which authorized the sending of American Special Operations troops to both friendly and hostile nations to gather intelligence and build ties with local forces. The seven-page directive did not appear to authorize offensive strikes in any specific countries. Its goals were to  “prepare the environment” for future attacks by American or local military forces, as well as to build networks that could “penetrate, disrupt, defeat or destroy” Al Qaeda and other militant groups.

New York Times Article on JUWTF order
U.S. defense officials stated to the New York Times in May 2010, that the JUWTF operationalized the views of many top U.S. commanders, among them General General David Petraeus, that the U.S. should undertake a more expanded role in world affairs, i.e. to operate beyond Iraq and Afghanistan. The New York Times wrote, "The order, which an official said was drafted in close coordination with Adm. Eric T. Olson, the officer in charge of the United States Special Operations Command, calls for clandestine activities that “cannot or will not be accomplished” by conventional military operations or “interagency activities,” a reference to American spy agencies". The Order focused on intelligence gathering — by American troops, foreign businesspeople, academics or others — to identify militants and provide “persistent situational awareness,” while forging ties to local indigenous groups. The order did not authorize offensive strikes in any specific countries.

Project Avocado
The JWUTF reported by the New York Times was one operation of a widescale expansion of worldwide clandestine military and intelligence operations authorized by the U.S. President in summer 2010, on advice of then-Joint Chiefs of Staff Director of Operations General Stanley McCrystal. The wider-scale program, formerly known as Project Avocado, gave U.S. military and other forces the authority to conduct unconventional warfare throughout the world. Project Avocado authorized combatant commanders to assemble task forces for almost any purpose, drawing from existing military units.

JUWTFs were not new, but prior to 2009, they were usually implemented for temporary and limited purposes. The Times article pointed out that the Bush administration did not provide such powers to U.S. military commands. The current JWUTF allows the U.S. military to insert American personnel into Iran, which is now authorized under Project Avocado.

References

Counterinsurgency
Counterterrorism in the United States